The long-nosed dasyure (Murexia naso) is a species of marsupial in the family Dasyuridae. It is found in Indonesia and Papua New Guinea. Its natural habitat is subtropical or tropical dry forests.

References

Dasyuromorphs
Mammals described in 1911
Taxonomy articles created by Polbot
Marsupials of New Guinea